No Sleep may refer to:

 Sleep deprivation, the condition of not receiving enough sleep

No Sleep may also refer to:

 No Sleep (LaViVe album), 2010
 No Sleep (Volumes album), 2014
 "No Sleep" (Jebediah song), 2004
 "No Sleep" (Martin Garrix song), featuring Bonn, 2019
 "No Sleep" (Sway song), 2013
 "No Sleep" (Wiz Khalifa song), 2011
 "No Sleep", a 2021 song by Crooked Colours
 "No Sleep", a song by Sam Roberts from the 2003 album We Were Born in a Flame
 No Sleep Records, a Californian independent record label

See also
 "No Sleeep", a 2015 song by Janet Jackson
 "No Sleepin'", a 2010 song by singer Corina and rapper JJ
 No No Sleep, a 2015 short film